The Roman Catholic Diocese of Berhampur is a diocese located in the city of Berhampur in the Ecclesiastical province of Cuttack-Bhubaneswar in India.

History
 24 January 1974: Established as Diocese of Berhampur from the Diocese of Cuttack

Leadership
 Bishops of Berhampur (Latin Rite)
 Bishop Sarat Chandra Nayak (27 November 2006 – present)
 Bishop Joseph Das  (3 May 1993 – 27 November 2006)
 Bishop Thomas Thiruthalil, C.M. (24 January 1974 – 18 December 1989)

Causes for canonisation
 Servant of God Fr. Valerian Guemes, C.M

References
 GCatholic.org
 Catholic Hierarchy

Roman Catholic dioceses in India
Christian organizations established in 1974
Roman Catholic dioceses and prelatures established in the 20th century
1974 establishments in Orissa
Christianity in Odisha
Berhampur